Isachsenfonna is a plateau glacier in Haakon VII Land at the northwestern part of Spitsbergen, Svalbard. The glacier is named after polar scientist Gunnar Isachsen, who traversed the glacier in 1906.

See also
List of glaciers in Svalbard

References

Glaciers of Spitsbergen